Shopping MallDova is a shopping mall in Chișinău, Moldova.

Overview 
MallDova is the first large format retail and entertainment commercial center in Moldova. It was opened on November 12, 2008, following an investment of €50 million. 

Shopping MallDova is located between Sectorul Botanica and Central Chișinău, on 21 Arborilor str., one of the main arteries of Chișinău. It has 800 parking spaces.

See also
București Mall
Plaza Romania

References
shoppingmalldova.md

Notes

Commercial buildings in Moldova
Buildings and structures in Chișinău
Shopping malls established in 2008